Le Journal (The Journal) was a Paris daily newspaper published from 1892 to 1944 in a small, four-page format.

Background
It was founded and edited by Fernand Arthur Pierre Xau until 1899.  It was bought and managed by the family of Henri Letellier in 1899 and became "the most Parisian, the most literary, and the most boulevardier of the newspapers of Paris" (Simon Arbellot, see Curnonsky).

During World War I, Le Journal was at the center of an intrigue involving Paul Bolo, the essence of which was that the German government was alleged to be attempting to gain influence in France and promote pacifist propaganda by buying French newspapers.

It is understood that during part of its existence it was located at 100 Rue Richelieu Paris. Source - Contemporary Medallion ( undated ).

After the fall of Paris on 14  June 1940, it fell back to Limoges, then Marseille, then Limoges again, and finally Lyon.

It had various supplements: Le Journal pour tous, 1891–1906; La Mode du Journal, 1896–1898; La Vraie mode, 1898–1913; Le Journal (Édition du littoral), 1907–1911.

1892 establishments in France
1944 disestablishments in France
Publications established in 1892
Publications disestablished in 1944
Defunct newspapers published in France
French Third Republic
Newspapers of the Vichy regime
Newspapers published in Paris
Mass media in Limoges
Mass media in Marseille
Mass media in Lyon
Daily newspapers published in France